The South Florida Bulls cross country program represents the University of South Florida in the sport of cross country. The program consists of separate men's and women's teams and competes in the American Athletic Conference within NCAA Division I. Both of the Bulls cross country teams are coached by Erik Jenkins, who is also the coach of the Bulls track and field teams. The teams practice and host meets at both the USF Track and Field Stadium and The Claw golf course.

Men 
Founded in 1965, the Bulls men's cross country team was one of the first athletic teams at USF. They have won seven conference championships, all coming between 1990 and 2000. They qualified for the Division I NCAA Championship in 1989, 1998, 1999 and 2000, and also qualified for the championship four times as members of NCAA Division II. Nine individual athletes have won individual conference championships.

Women 
The USF women's cross country team was founded in 1987. They have won five team conference championships and one individual conference championship. They also won the NCAA South Regional in 1999 and 2000 and qualified for the NCAA Championship every year between 1997 and 2001.

See also 
University of South Florida

South Florida Bulls

South Florida Bulls track and field

References 

cross country